MarriageToday was established in April 1994 by Jimmy & Karen Evans. Manta lists its home address as: MarriageToday, 4501 Merlot Avenue #200, Grapevine, TX 76051.

A statement in the Evangelical Council for Financial Accountability (ECFA) website, submitted by MarriageToday says its mission is "to produce, air and distribute religious and educational seminars, books, audiotapes, videotapes, radio and television programs, and literature to further the proclamation of the Gospel of Jesus Christ." The MarriageToday website says the organization, a Christian nonprofit entity, performs a variety of functions:
Produces the MarriageToday television show, which is broadcast on four networks: Daystar Television Network, Trinity Broadcasting Network (TBN), The Word Network, the Christian Television Network (CTN).
Has local broadcasts on eight local channels.
Conducts various live conferences and marriage seminars to a number of satellite locations worldwide.
The MarriageToday website offers various books, CDs and DVDs, mostly produced by Jimmy and Karen Evans.
The website provides a Christian marriage counselor locator page.

Accreditation
Two websites provide information on the validity of MarriageToday's ministry. One is the Ministry Watch website. This site lists MarriageToday as a valid Christian ministry.

The ECFA website provides a detailed view of MarriageToday's finances. ECFA uses data provided by this organization. It shows for the 2011 year $1,612,131 was spent directly for MarriageToday's program. $2,358,264 was spent on administrative expenses and $241,899 was spent on fundraising. A deficit of $260,346 was posted for the year. ECFA shows MarriageToday had deficits for 2009 and 2010, as well.

References

Christian organizations based in the United States